The Sultan's Daughter is a 1943 American comedy film directed by Arthur Dreifuss and written by Milton Raison and Tim Ryan. The film stars Ann Corio, Charles Butterworth, Tim Ryan, Irene Ryan, Edward Norris and Fortunio Bonanova. The film was released on December 16, 1943, by Monogram Pictures.

Plot

Cast          
Ann Corio as Patra
Charles Butterworth as Sultan of Araband
Tim Ryan as Tim
Irene Ryan as Irene
Edward Norris as Jimmy
Fortunio Bonanova as Kuda
Jack La Rue as Rata
Gene Roth as Ludwig
Chris-Pin Martin as Merchant
Joseph J. Greene as Benson
Freddie Fisher as Orchestra Leader

References

External links
 

1943 films
American comedy films
1943 comedy films
Monogram Pictures films
Films directed by Arthur Dreifuss
American black-and-white films
Films scored by Karl Hajos
1940s English-language films
1940s American films